Loblolly was a porridge or stew, coming to mean swamp. It is used in the names of:

Loblolly pine (Pinus taeda), a tree
Loblolly-bay (Gordonia lasianthus), a tree
Loblolly boy, an assistant to a ship's surgeon
Loblolly Stable, a horse breeding and racing stable in Arkansas, US